Brian Keith Price (born June 24, 1994) is a former American football nose tackle. He played college football at UTSA, and was signed by the Green Bay Packers as an undrafted free agent in 2016.

Early years
Price attended McCutcheon High School. As a senior, he received All-state, All-area and All-conference honors at defensive tackle. He enrolled at Allan Hancock College in 2012. He transferred after the season to the University of Texas at San Antonio.

As a freshman, he was a starter at defensive tackle, posting 61 tackles (second on the team), 4 tackles for loss and a half sack in 9 games, receiving a second-team All-Northern Conference honors. As a sophomore he appeared in 12 games (2 starts), making 25 tackles (one for loss) and 4 quarterback hurries.

As a junior, he appeared in 9 games (one start), collecting 23 tackles (2 for loss) and 2 quarterback hurries. As a senior, he started 10 games, registering 33 tackles (2 for loss) and one sack.

Statistics

Professional career

Green Bay Packers
Price was signed as an undrafted free agent by the Green Bay Packers after the 2016 NFL Draft on May 6. On September 3, he was released by the Packers during final team cuts and was signed to the practice squad the next day. On September 22, he was promoted from the practice squad to the active roster and made his NFL debut against the Detroit Lions in Week 3. On October 15, he was released by the Packers and re-signed back to the practice squad.

He signed a futures contract with the Packers on January 24, 2017. He was waived on September 2.

Dallas Cowboys
On September 3, 2017, Price was claimed off waivers by the Dallas Cowboys. He was placed on injured reserve on November 8, after undergoing knee surgery.

On March 12, 2018, Price signed a two-year contract extension with the Cowboys. He was released on September 2, with the intention of re-signing him after Datone Jones was placed on the injured reserve list.

Oakland Raiders
On September 3, 2018, Price was claimed off waivers by the Oakland Raiders, spoiling the Cowboys' plans of re-signing him. He was waived on September 18, 2018.

Cleveland Browns
The Cleveland Browns signed Price to their practice squad on September 21, 2018. He was elevated to the main roster on October 4, 2018. Price was waived by the Browns on August 31, 2019.

Indianapolis Colts
On September 2, 2019, Price was signed to the Indianapolis Colts practice squad. He was released on October 1.

Jacksonville Jaguars
On October 23, 2019, Price was signed to the Jacksonville Jaguars practice squad. He signed a reserve/future contract with the Jaguars on December 30, 2019.

On August 9, 2020, Price was placed on injured reserve with the knee injury. He was released with an injury settlement on August 17, 2020.

Green Bay Packers (second stint)
On December 15, 2020, Price was signed to the Green Bay Packers' practice squad. He was elevated to the active roster on December 26 and January 2, 2021, for the team's weeks 16 and 17 games against the Tennessee Titans and Chicago Bears, and reverted to the practice squad after each game. He was again elevated on January 15 and 23 for the team's divisional playoff game against the Los Angeles Rams and NFC Championship Game against the Tampa Bay Buccaneers, and reverted to the practice squad again following each game. His practice squad contract with the team expired after the season on February 1, 2021.

Detroit Lions
On June 1, 2021, Price signed with the Detroit Lions. He announced his retirement on July 27, 2021.

NFL career statistics

Regular season

References

External links

UTSA Roadrunners bio

1994 births
Living people
Players of American football from Indiana
Sportspeople from Lafayette, Indiana
American football defensive tackles
Allan Hancock Bulldogs football players
UTSA Roadrunners football players
Green Bay Packers players
Dallas Cowboys players
Oakland Raiders players
Cleveland Browns players
Indianapolis Colts players
Jacksonville Jaguars players
Detroit Lions players